Guillermo Balboa (born 1930) is a Mexican weightlifter. He competed in the men's lightweight event at the 1956 Summer Olympics.

References

1930 births
Living people
Mexican male weightlifters
Olympic weightlifters of Mexico
Weightlifters at the 1956 Summer Olympics
Place of birth missing (living people)
20th-century Mexican people